Kars station is a railway station, serving the eastern Turkish city of Kars. It is one of the easternmost stations on the Trans-Anatolian railway. The Eastern Express services Kars once a day to İstanbul. Between 1993 and 2011, there was no train service east of Kars due to the Turkish-Armenian border closure. But as of February 2011, a regional train operates twice daily from Kars to Akyaka, the last Turkish town before the border, stopping at the Akyaka railway station.

The station was opened in 1899, by the Transcaucasus Railway, when Kars was under the rule of the Russian Empire in order to have better control over the Ottoman front. The tracks were originally standard Russian 5-foot gauge. After the Turkish War of Independence, Kars was given back to Turkey. The Turkish State Railways took over the station, but Kars remained isolated from the rest of the network until 1939, when a standard gauge line was built to Erzurum. Passengers would change to a narrow gauge train from Erzurum to Kars. The Narrow gauge line was replaced with standard gauge in 1957 and the broad gauge line was replaced in 1962.

It is the terminus of the Kars–Gyumri–Tbilisi railway, and the Baku–Tbilisi–Akhalkalaki–Kars railway.

1899 establishments in the Ottoman Empire
Railway stations in Kars Province
Railway stations opened in 1899
Kars Central District